The Thomas R. Ayer House (also known as the Parr House) is a historic house located in Oklawaha, Florida. It is architecturally significant as the best example of the Queen Anne style in rural Marion County. It is also significant in that it is associated with Thomas Ayer, a citrus pioneer of Marion County.

Description and history 
The exterior finish of the house is horizontal, wooden weatherboard. The building has a variety of roof forms, most of which are gabled, with various degrees of pitch. Other types of roofs and roof features include a gable dormer, a flat roof, pent roof, and shed roofs. Both primary and secondary roof surfaces are covered by galvanized sheet metal in a V-crimp pattern. The roof is pierced by two brick, corbelled chimneys on the north and west sides of the building, and an exterior brick chimney is located on the east side of the rear addition.

At the time the house was built, the surrounding land was mostly orange groves and was sparsely populated. Although the property is named for Thomas Ayer, property records indicate the original owners of the house were actually L. J. and Lucy Parr, who bought the land from General Robert Bullock in 1885. By 1887, they had given the property and newly constructed house to Ayer.

It was added to the National Register of Historic Places on July 13, 1993.

Gallery

References

External links
 Marion County listings at National Register of Historic Places
 Marion County listings at Florida's Office of Cultural and Historical Programs

Houses on the National Register of Historic Places in Florida
National Register of Historic Places in Marion County, Florida
Houses in Marion County, Florida
Queen Anne architecture in Florida
Houses completed in 1885